Balak was a Biblical king of Moab.

Balak may also refer to:

Surname
Abdullah Balak (born 1938), Turkish composer
Emre Balak (born 1988), Turkish footballer

First name or alias
Belek Ghazi, 12th-century Turkish emir
Alias of Ali Waheed (born 1984), Maldivian politician
Alias of French cartoonist Yves Bigerel
Balak Singh (1797–1862), Indian Sikh religious leader

Places
Balak, Armenia, in Syunik Province
Balak, Kerman, a village in Kerman Province, Iran
Balak, Kurdistan, a village in Kurdistan Province, Iran
Balak Island, Malaysia

Other
Balak (parsha), a section of the Hebrew bible
Balak tribe, a Kurdish tribe
Bałak, a sociolect of the Polish language
Operation Balak, 1948 undercover operation to smuggle aircraft from Eastern Europe to Israel